Vilhelmine Else Kathrine Dorthe Chemnitz (née Josefsen, 28 June 1894, Qaqortoq – 1 December 1978, Nuuk) was a Greenlandic politician, and a champion of Greenlandic women's education.

Biography
Chemnitz's parents were Kanuthus Josefsen and Juliane Kielsen. She married Jørgen Chemnitz in 1917, and together they had six children, including Guldborg and Lars Chemnitz. Early in 1900, there were no educational opportunities for women in Greenland. She therefore got a job as a maid, with a Danish family. She traveled to Denmark with this family to Denmark, where they tried to enroll her in school, but Chemnitz was rejected on the grounds that she would not be respected in Denmark. As a result of this refusal, Chemnitz later became a champion of Greenlandic women's education. Chemnitz married into an influential and well-educated family. This gave her an opportunity to help establish the first women's association in Greenland in Nuuk in 1948.

Chemnitz was president of the new organization, and she later established several local women's associations, which were combined into a national organization in 1960 with her as the chair. This association was called The Greenland Women Societies Association (APK – Kalaallit Nunaanni Arnat Illuat Kattuffiat). In 1948, she became a member of the Greenland Commission, as the only Greenlandic woman. Here she had jobs in several committees and with others, secured the establishment of schools in Qaqortoq and Aasiaat. When her position ended in 1950, she was awarded the Royal Medal of Recompense in gold.

Death and legacy
Chemnitz died at Nuuk in 1978. In 1998 Greenals issued a commemorative postage stamp bearing Chemnitz's picture and celebrating 50 years since the formation of the first women's society in Greenland.

References

1894 births
1978 deaths
Greenlandic women in politics
People from Qaqortoq
20th-century women politicians
20th-century Greenlandic politicians